Oktavijan Miletić (1 October 1902 – 17 August 1987) was a Croatian cinematographer and director. His avant-garde work in the period from 1928 to 1945 remains as one of the foundations of Croatian film.

Miletić was one of the founders of the Zagreb film club in 1928.

Miletić participated in an amateur film competition in Paris in 1933 with his Poslovi konzula Dorgena and received an award from Louis Lumière. His 1937 film Šešir was the first Croatian movie filmed with sound. In the Independent State of Croatia, Miletić filmed three cultural films for Germany's Tobis Film: Hrvatski kipari, Hrvatski seljački život and Agram, die Hauptstadt Kroatiens. While all three films were originally thought lost, Daniel Rafaelić discovered Hrvatski seljački život in a Vienna film archive in 2004 and in 2008 discovered Agram, die Hauptstadt Kroatiens in a German film archive.

In 1942 he filmed Barok u Hrvatskoj, about the life of count Janko Drašković. In 1944 Miletić filmed the full-length feature Lisinski about the Croatian composer Vatroslav Lisinski. He spent the waning months of the Second World War working to safekeep the films of the Croatian state institute Hrvatski slikopis.

In 1967 he received the Vladimir Nazor Award for lifetime achievement in film arts. The Oktavijan Award is awarded annually by the Croatian Association of Film Critics as part of the Days of Croatian Film.

He was born in Zagreb, which is also where he died.

Filmography
Most (1938)
Barok u Hrvatskoj (1942)
Agram, die Hauptstadt Kroatiens (1943)
Lisinski (1944)

References

External links

Oktavijan Miletić biography at hrfilm.hr 

1902 births
1987 deaths
Croatian cinematographers
Croatian film directors
Film people from Zagreb
Vladimir Nazor Award winners
Burials at Mirogoj Cemetery